Farkhodbek Sobirov (born ) is an Uzbekistani weightlifter competing in the 94 kg category.

Career
Sobirov is a two time Junior World Champion (in 2016 and 2017)

He recently competed at the 2017 World Weightlifting Championships in the 94 kg division, winning a silver medal in the snatch portion of the competition, he was unable to make a clean & jerk and could not post a total.

Major results

References

1997 births
Living people
Uzbekistani male weightlifters
21st-century Uzbekistani people
Weightlifters at the 2014 Summer Youth Olympics